V.R. Khajuria (5 December 1934 – 5 December 1990) was an artist and sculptor. He served in the department of Sculptor in Institute of Music & Fine Arts, Jammu. He was born in Jammu, Gurah, Salathia.

References

1934 births
1990 deaths
People from Jammu (city)
Indian male sculptors
People from Jammu and Kashmir
20th-century Indian sculptors
20th-century Indian male artists